Francis Joseph "Bucko" Kilroy (May 30, 1921 – July 10, 2007) was an American football player and executive. Kilroy was born in the Port Richmond section of Philadelphia, where he attended St. Anne's grade school before attending Northeast Catholic High School and then Temple University. As a Junior at North he played on the Falcons Championship team of 1937.

Kilroy was originally recruited by Notre Dame but went on to become one of the finest linemen in Temple football history. He starred for the Owls in the 1940 and 1941 seasons, helping Temple defeat rivals Penn State, Bucknell and Villanova in the same year for the first and only time in school history. He played both offense and defense and started every game in 1941 en route to becoming the first Temple football player to receive Honorable Mention All-America honors. In 1942 & part of 1943 he served in the Merchant marines during World War II.

Drafted by the Eagles he played offensive and defensive line in the National Football League for 13 seasons (All with the Eagles). He also was often called one of the toughest, if not the dirtiest, player of that era.  Despite that reputation he won two NFL championships with the 1948 and 1949 Eagles and was a Pro-Bowl selection 3 times during his career.  Bucko missed only one of 203 games because of an injury. He also played in 147 consecutive games, which was a league record at the time.  A Two-way line starter for championship teams in '48 and '49 and for runners-up in '47,  Bucko helped Steve Van Buren win several NFL rushing titles in that time span. He also had 5 career interceptions on Defense.

Hall of Famer Art Donovan had this to say about him: "The beginnings of the Colt-Eagle rivalry probably had something to do with a guy named Frank Kilroy.  They called him Bad News Kilroy, and he was.  The dirty bastard was a legend by the time I got into the league.  It was the first thing they warned a rookie: Watch out for the Irish bum.  He was really pretty unbelievable.  He took kickoffs literally.  He'd run downfield kicking people, just kicking them out of bounds.  And he never got called for it.  The officials would just let him do it."

After retiring from football as a player Kilroy became an assistant coach with the Eagles from 1955 til 1959.  He then went on to work as a scout for the Redskins and then the Dallas Cowboys.  He was instrumental in drafting Roger Staubach despite his Military service.  Kilroy was also credited as a founder of the modern day NFL Draft and as an NFL Executive he helped fashion the Super Bowl as we know it today. He later became the General Manager of the New England Patriots in the 1980s when they went to their first Super Bowl in 1985 (losing to the Bears).  As the head of scouting in early 2000s Bucko was Instrumental in drafting many of players that won three Super Bowls for the New England Patriots.

Bucko was inducted into the North Catholic HS Hall of Fame, The Temple University Athletic Hall of Fame and the Philadelphia Sports Hall of Fame. He was also named to the NFLs All-Decade Team of the 1940s.  Bucko Kilroy died in Foxboro Mass., July 10, 2007 at the age of 86.

Executive career
1960-1961 Scout Philadelphia Eagles
1962-1964 Scout Washington Redskins
1965-1970 Scout Dallas Cowboys
1971-1978 Director Player Personnel New England Patriots
1979-1982 General Manager New England Patriots
1983-1993 Vice President New England Patriots
1994-2006 Scout Consultant New England Patriots

References

External links
 

1921 births
2007 deaths
American football offensive guards
American football offensive tackles
New England Patriots executives
New England Patriots scouts
Philadelphia Eagles players
Steagles players and personnel
Temple Owls football players
National Football League general managers
Eastern Conference Pro Bowl players
Players of American football from Pennsylvania
Dallas Cowboys scouts
United States Merchant Mariners of World War II
Burials at Massachusetts National Cemetery